

Events
New York Secret Service Chief William J. Flynn issues a statement regarding the Black Hand as "the most secret and terrible organization in the world".
Spring – Backed by Monk Eastman, the Cherry Hill Gang and a new generation of Whyos under Bill "the Brute" Sanger begin fighting amongst each other resulting in hundreds being injured in gunfights. Crime in the area, particularly armed robbery and assault, dramatically increases as a result.
April 14 – New York police find a body stuffed in a barrel, similar to the New Orleans "barrel murders" of the previous decade.  The dead man was later identified by a US Secret Service agent as Benedetto Madonia, an associate of counterfeiters and Black Hand leaders Giuseppe Morello, Tomasso "The Ox" Petto, and Ignazio "the Wolf" Lupo. This would later lead to an investigation by New York police detective Joseph Petrosino.
September 16–17 – A particularly violent gun battle between the Eastman and the Five Points Gangs, over an attempted raid by the Five Pointers of a local Rivington Street stuss game, eventually involves over a hundred gangsters (including the Gophers who fired at both the Eastmans and Five Pointers alike) causing Tammany Hall to force leaders Monk Eastman and Paul Kelly to make peace.
Winter – The truce between Monk Eastman and Paul Kelly ends after a barroom brawl in a Bowery dive bar between gang members Hurst and Ford, of the Eastmans and Five Pointers respectively, with Hurst seriously injured. Eastman, demanding Ford's life, threatens to invade Kelly's territory. With Kelly's refusal to turn Ford over to the Eastmans, both sides again prepare for war. However, a truce is again arranged by Tammany Hall politician Tom Foley, who threatens to withdraw political protection from the gangs if they did not comply. A prize fight is arranged between the two gang leaders which lasts over two hours until both men eventually collapse and the fight is declared a draw. Following the fight, both gang leaders continue preparing for war.
 Giuseppe Masseria emigrates to New York, United States from Sicily to escape a murder charge.

Arts and literature

Births
Vincent "Mad Dog" Coll, Irish American, Prohibition era gangster
Samuel Levine (Joseph Brown) "Red", New York (Brooklyn) mobster and Murder, Inc. member
David Berman, Murder, Inc. member and Las Vegas crime syndicate member
Russell Bufalino, Pennsylvania crime syndicate leader
Frank Wortman, St. Louis crime syndicate leader and Shelton Gang member
September 22 – Joseph Valachi, Genovese crime family soldier, and government informant.

Deaths

References

Organized crime
Years in organized crime